Cantonal elections to elect half the membership of the general councils of France's 100  departments were held on 9 and 16 March 2008. These elections coincided with the municipal elections, in which the left did well.

Electoral system
The cantonal elections use a two-round system similar to that employed in the country's legislative elections. 
Councillors are elected from single-member constituencies (the cantons). 
A candidate securing the votes of at least 25% of the canton's registered voters and more than 50% of the total number of votes actually cast in the first round of voting is thereby elected. If no candidate satisfies these conditions, then a second round of voting is held one week later.
Entitled to present themselves in the second round are the two candidates who received the highest number of votes in the first round, plus any other candidate or candidates who received the votes of at least 10% of those registered to vote in the canton.
In the second round, the candidate receiving the highest number of votes is elected.

Change in control

From right to left

Ain (PS)
Allier (PCF)
Corrèze (PS)
Indre-et-Loire (PS)
Lot-et-Garonne (PS)
Deux-Sèvres (PS)
Somme (PS)
Val-d'Oise (PS)

From PCF to PS

Seine-Saint-Denis

From PRG to PS

Hautes-Pyrénées

From centre to right

Pyrénées-Atlantiques (UMP)

From left to right

Hautes-Alpes (UMP)
Mayotte (UMP)

From UMP to NC

Côte-d'Or

From UMP to DVD

Jura

Past general council presidents

 François Hollande, first secretary of the PS elected in Corrèze
 Arnaud Montebourg, PS deputy elected in Saône-et-Loire
 Hervé Gaymard, former UMP minister elected in Savoie
 Dominique Bussereau, former UMP minister elected in Charente-Maritime
 Claude Bartolone, PS deputy elected in Seine-Saint-Denis

Notable new councillors

 Jean Sarkozy, son of President Nicolas Sarkozy, elected in Neuilly-Sud (Hauts-de-Seine) as the UMP candidate

National results

Sources
Ministry of the Interior results

cantonal
2008
Cantonal elections